Weerawut Kayem (23 March 1993) is a Thai professional footballer.

History
Kayem is part of the first-generation players from JMG Academy of Muangthong United. He plays in the left-back position. His first match in senior career was in Thai League Cup 2010 Samut Prakan F.C. vs Muangthong United where he played for full 90 minutes.

International
Kayem has been called up to the Thai National Pre-Olympic Squad for the Olympics 2012 Game qualification matches. Weerawut Kayem received a call to the Thai National team and played his first match against Lao national team on 9 December 2012.

Honours

Club
Muangthong United
 Thai League 1 (1) : 2012
PT Prachuap
 Thai League Cup (1) : 2019

External links
 Goal.com 
 Players Profile - info.thscore.com
 Soccerway

References

1993 births
Living people
Weerawut Kayem
Weerawut Kayem
Association football fullbacks
Weerawut Kayem
Weerawut Kayem
Weerawut Kayem
Weerawut Kayem
Weerawut Kayem
Weerawut Kayem
Weerawut Kayem
Weerawut Kayem
Nakhon Si United F.C. players